Kodwo Addison (1927–1985) also known as Charles Afful Addison was a Ghanaian politician and a trade unionist. He was the member of parliament representing the Ateiku constituency from 1965 to 1966. Prior to joining parliament he had served on various positions for the Ghana Trade Union Congress. He also once served as the director of the Kwame Nkrumah Ideological Institute.

Early life and education
Addison was born on 23 May 1927. He completed his elementary education in 1944 and entered the School of Architecture at Cape Coast. There he studied from 1945 to 1947 obtaining his diploma in draftsmanship. In 1953 he acquired a trade union scholarship to study at a trade union college in Hungary. He graduated in 1954 obtaining his diploma in political economy.

Career and politics
Addison was Secretary General of the maritime workers union but was ousted in 1955. He remained unemployed until August 1958 when he was made principal of the Ghana Labour College by the Ghana Trade Union Congress. A year later he was made the administrative secretary of the trade union congress. He worked in this position for about six months and was later moved to the Economic Department of the Trades Union Congress serving there as a director. That same year he was transferred to the Political and Social Affairs department of the Trades Union Congress. He was appointed the Administrative Secretary of the All African Peoples Conference in 1960 while he doubled as a news consultant of Radio Ghana. In November 1962 he was appointed director of the Kwame Nkrumah Ideological Institute which was then in Winneba. He remained in that post until the overthrow of the Nkrumah government. In 1965 he became a member of parliament representing the Ateiku constituency in the Central Region of Ghana. Addison served on various public boards and councils prior to the 1966 coup d'état. Some of these were the University Council and the Institute of Public Education.

Personal life
Addison married Charlotte Addison on 17 September 1956. He died in 1985.

See also
 List of MPs elected in the 1965 Ghanaian parliamentary election

References

1927 births
1985 deaths
Ghanaian MPs 1965–1966
20th-century Ghanaian politicians
Ghanaian expatriates in Hungary